Shailendra Nath Shrivastava (26 October 1936 – 12 February 2006) was former Indian politician from Bihar. He was born at Chausa Bhojpur district. In 1980 he was elected to Bihar Legislative Assembly and in 1989, he was elected to Lok Sabha from Patna constituency of Bihar. He was a recipient of the civilian honour of Padma Shri (2003).

References

http://164.100.47.132/LssNew/biodata_1_12/3419.htm

1936 births
2006 deaths
People from Bhojpur district, India
Recipients of the Padma Shri in literature & education
India MPs 1989–1991
Lok Sabha members from Bihar
Bihar MLAs 1980–1985
Bharatiya Janata Party politicians from Bihar